Mall del Norte is a super regional shopping mall in Laredo, Texas. The mall opened in 1977 and has since been renovated in 1991, 1993 (expansion), 2007, and 2012. It is located along Interstate 35 in the city's rapidly growing retail hub of town. La Plaza Mall in McAllen, Texas is larger by 3,000 sq. feet.

In 2007, as part of the renovations of the mall, Cinemark Theater 16 and Circuit City constructed where the former Montgomery Ward store was located. The mall is currently owned by CBL & Associates Properties.

On July 1, 2020, it was announced that Sears would be closing as part of a plan to close 28 stores nationwide. The store closed in September 2020.

Anchor stores
Anchor store include:
Chuck E. Cheese's
Cinemark Theatres
Dillard's 
Forever 21
JCPenney
Macy’s
Macy's Home Store
Main Event
TruFit Athletic Club

Former
Foley's - sold to/became Macy's
Foley's Home Store - sold to/became Macy's Home Store
Hachar's - local upscale department store shutdown early 1990s became Foley's
Montgomery Ward - shutdown nationwide became Circuit City and Cinemark Theater
Richter's - local upscale department store shutdown early 1990s became Foley's Home Store
Mervyn's - nationwide shutdown closed on December 29, 2008, now Forever 21 since March 2009
Circuit City - nationwide shutdown closed on March 8, 2009. Replaced with a Chuck E. Cheese's in December 2010.
Bealls - bankruptcy shutdown closed in May 2020.
Joe Brand - moved locations in early 2018. Replaced with a TruFit Athletic Club
Sears - nationwide shutdown closed in September 2020.

Gallery

External links
Mall Del Norte official website

References

Shopping malls in Texas
Shopping malls established in 1977
Buildings and structures in Laredo, Texas
CBL Properties
Tourist attractions in Webb County, Texas
1977 establishments in Texas